For people with the surname, see Filkins (surname).

Church and chapel

Church of England
The Gothic Revival architect G.E. Street designed the Church of England parish church of Saint Peter, and it was built in 1855–57. The parish is now part of the Benefice of Shill Valley and Broadshire.

Methodist
The Methodist chapel was dedicated in 1833.

Local government 
Filkins was historically a hamlet in the ancient parish (and civil parish from 1866) of Broadwell.  It became a separate civil parish in 1896, within Witney Rural District.  In 1954 the civil parish was merged with the parish of Broughton Poggs to form the civil parish of Filkins and Broughton Poggs, part of West Oxfordshire since 1974.

Social and economic history
Swinford Museum occupies a 17th-century cottage in Filkins and stands alongside the former village lock-up. George Swinford founded the museum in 1931 with the help of Sir Stafford Cripps.  In 2007 the Filkins estate, which Sir John Cripps (son of the post-war Labour minister Sir Stafford Cripps) bequeathed upon his death in 1993, but which had been partly passed over to the Ernest Cook Trust since then, was fully transferred to the Trust's portfolio. The Filkins Estate is on the county boundary between Gloucestershire and Oxfordshire and includes one  farm and a number of cottages, with a small area of commercial units housing the Cotswold Woollen Weavers and Filkins Stone Company.

Amenities
Filkins has a public house, the Five Alls. The village has an outdoor swimming pool owned by the Centre Trust which was established by Sir Stafford Cripps under the control of the parish council (acting as trustees). The pool, now managed by the Filkins Swimming Club, is open from May until September. Next to it are the village shop, post office and bowls club. A large 18th-century barn is now the premises of Cotswold Woollen Weavers, which set up business there in 1982, and is the last company in the area to uphold the traditions of woollen cloth design and manufacture. Filkins has a theatre club. The former village school is now a pre-school nursery.

References

Sources and further reading

External links

Villages in Oxfordshire
West Oxfordshire District
Former civil parishes in Oxfordshire